Imprint is the second album by American metalcore/hardcore band Vision of Disorder, released on July 14, 1998. It was the band's last album released while signed to Roadrunner Records and remains their best-selling album to date. The record was recorded in the space of 19 days with producer Dave Sardy, who has worked with artist like Helmet and Marilyn Manson.

Imprint was listed in Kerrang!'s "21 Best U.S. Metalcore Albums of All Time" in March 2018.

The album's title is a reference to a permanently scarring knife incident that happened to vocalist Tim Williams.

Track listing 
Standard release

Japanese edition

Charts

References

1998 albums
Albums produced by Dave Sardy
Vision of Disorder albums